Harewood is a northwestern suburb of Christchurch, New Zealand. The suburb is split by State Highway 1, with the bulk of Harewood's residential areas to the east of the highway and its industrial areas to the west.

Demographics

Harewood had a population of 1,386 at the 2018 New Zealand census, a decrease of 15 people (-1.1%) since the 2013 census, and a decrease of 42 people (-2.9%) since the 2006 census. There were 495 households. There were 705 males and 681 females, giving a sex ratio of 1.04 males per female. The median age was 49.1 years (compared with 37.4 years nationally), with 195 people (14.1%) aged under 15 years, 240 (17.3%) aged 15 to 29, 657 (47.4%) aged 30 to 64, and 294 (21.2%) aged 65 or older.

Ethnicities were 83.3% European/Pākehā, 3.5% Māori, 1.5% Pacific peoples, 14.1% Asian, and 2.6% other ethnicities (totals add to more than 100% since people could identify with multiple ethnicities).

The proportion of people born overseas was 21.9%, compared with 27.1% nationally.

Although some people objected to giving their religion, 43.1% had no religion, 49.1% were Christian, 0.4% were Hindu, 1.5% were Buddhist and 0.9% had other religions.

Of those at least 15 years old, 321 (27.0%) people had a bachelor or higher degree, and 159 (13.4%) people had no formal qualifications. The median income was $37,800, compared with $31,800 nationally. The employment status of those at least 15 was that 561 (47.1%) people were employed full-time, 210 (17.6%) were part-time, and 30 (2.5%) were unemployed.

Economy

In addition to State Highway 1 passing through the suburb, Harewood is a major transport hub for Christchurch and the South Island owing to Christchurch International Airport sitting within the suburb. The airport is the second-busiest in New Zealand after only Auckland Airport, bringing approximately 6.9 million passengers through Harewood in 2019. As a result of the airport, Harewood is also home to many freight and other industrial businesses which rely upon proximity to the airport, as well as rental car and campervan companies.  

The suburb is also home to the International Antarctic Centre, a major Christchurch tourist attraction centred around the city's role as a departure point for many national Antarctic programmes. The centre was established in 1990, and is home to the administration offices of the New Zealand, United States, and Italian Antarctic programmes alongside multiple Antarctic-focused attractions. Hagglund armoured vehicles can occasionally be seen on roads around the Centre, offering rides to tourists.

The median income of Harewood residents aged 15 or more was $29,900 per annum, $100 more than the median income for the whole of Christchurch city.

Education
Harewood School is a contributing primary school catering for years 1 to 6.

References

Suburbs of Christchurch